Linanthus pungens (syn. Leptodactylon pungens) is a species of flowering plant in the phlox family known by the common names granite prickly-phlox and granite gilia. It is native to western North America from British Columbia to Baja California and east to Montana and New Mexico.

This plant has been called a shrub or a perennial herb with an especially woody base. It produces several stems which may grow erect or may be short and spreading, forming a mat. Mat-forming plants are more common at higher elevations. When erect it can reach  in height but is usually shorter. The stems are densely covered in solid, narrow, sharp-pointed leaves. Flowers are solitary or grow in clusters at the ends of the stems. The flowers generally open at night, when they are pollinated by moths. The flowers and herbage are aromatic. The fruit is a cylindrical capsule with three valves, each valve holding about 5 to 10 seeds.

This plant occurs in pine forests, pinyon-juniper woodlands, sagebrush steppe, and grasslands, and their ecotones. It can be found in subalpine and alpine climates. It can be found in mountain passes and high-elevation fell fields and in lower elevation desert washes. It can tolerate a wide range of conditions, from harsh winters on exposed mountain slopes to hot summers in desert valleys. It is more common in dry climates with low levels of precipitation, and it is tolerant of drought. The plant grows in poor, shallow, rocky, sandy, and salty soils, sometimes in thin layers of soil overlying bedrock. It can grow and is common on volcanic soils, such as pumice, lava and andesite. It is a dominant species in some areas, for example, the white pine-mountain hemlock forests and shrublands in El Dorado County, California, and the sagebrush near the U.S. Sheep Experiment Station in eastern Idaho.

References

External links
CalPhotos Photo Gallery

pungens
Flora of North America